Os Fantoches (English: The Puppets) is a 1967 Brazilian telenovela created by Ivani Ribeiro, and starring Átila Iório.

Plot 
Aníbal (Átila Iório) is a millionaire, knowing that he is going to die, invites a group of relatives and friends to stay at his luxury hotel. They are all linked to a mystery of their past. Some will be rewarded with inclusion in the will; others will be punished. To know who was his real friend and who harmed him, Aníbal starts to manipulate everyone, as if they were puppets.

Cast 
Átila Iório .... Aníbal
Dina Sfat .... Laura
Nicette Bruno .... Estela
Paulo Goulart .... Marcos
Flora Geny .... Nazaré
Ivan de Albuquerque .... Gilberto
Regina Duarte .... Bete
Mauro Mendonça
Elizabeth Gasper .... Simone
Renato Master .... Victor
Rogério Márcico
Stênio Garcia .... Torquato
Márcia de Windsor .... Consuelo
Yara Lins .... Guiomar
Lídia Costa .... Odila
Silvio Rocha .... Nicanor
Edgard Franco .... Joel
Estela Gomes .... Zezé
Vera Nunes .... Julieta
Ayres Pinto .... Nando
Tereza Campos .... Luisa
Noira Mello
Renato Júnior

References

External links

TV Excelsior original programming
1967 telenovelas
Brazilian telenovelas
1967 Brazilian television series debuts
1968 Brazilian television series endings
Portuguese-language telenovelas